Andrew Plympton was the President of St Kilda Football Club between 1993 and 2000, during which time the club enjoyed improved success from the previous barren 20 years.

Under Andrew Plympton's administration St Kilda advanced to the 1997 Grand Final, its first since 1971, but were ultimately unsuccessful losing to the Adelaide Crows by 31 points.

Also under Andrew Plympton, St Kilda won its first ever pre-season cup in 1996 with a 58-point win over reigning premier Carlton. Plympton's reign did see an upturn in success for St Kilda and was generally regarded as a successful time in terms of turning the club around and seeing a large increase in membership for much of this time. The strict financial management Plympton brought to the club kept it afloat and laid the foundations for its later prosperity under Rod Butterss.

Plympton is also the chairman of sports merchandise retailer Beyond Sports International (formerly known as Concept Sports), chairman of Bitcoin Group, former president and Honorary Member (Life) of Australian Sailing Limited (formerly Yachting Australia) and a member of the Australian Olympic Committee executive.

Plympton is the longest serving President of Australian Sailing (formerly Yachting Australia.)

Childhood and education
Plympton is born in Melbourne.

References

Year of birth missing (living people)
Living people
People educated at Brighton Grammar School
St Kilda Football Club administrators
Sailing in Australia
Australian businesspeople